Edna Alexander was a Canadian-born soprano based in the United States and later Europe. She sang with various theater companies in the United States, including the Afro-American Opera Company, Cole & Johnson, and Williams and Walker Co.

Biography
Alexander was born in Woodstock, Ontario, Canada, the daughter of George Alexander. When she was young, her family moved to Toledo, Ohio and then Chicago, Illinois. She started out singing as a child in the Quinn Chapel choir in Chicago, and later sang in the choir at Bethel Church.

In 1895 she moved to the East Coast, where she performed as a singer. In 1896 she was part of the Afro-American Opera Company. She was the lead soprano in Cole & Johnson's "A Trip to Coontown", and also performed for the Williams & Walker Company. In 1905, she traveled to Europe as part of a performance, and continued to live there until the end of her life. While abroad, she married "Billy" Farrell who worked in variety shows.

Alexander died from tuberculosis in August 1913 in Vienna, Austria.

Theater
Sons of Ham
A Trip to Coontown

References

Year of birth unknown
1913 deaths
American sopranos
Canadian emigrants to the United States
Stage actresses
Tuberculosis deaths in Austria
20th-century deaths from tuberculosis